Queen Sapyeong of the Jeonju Yi clan was the first and primary wife of King Gangjong of Goryeo when he was still a crown prince who just reigned for 9 months. Descended from Yi Yongbu, she would become the first cousin fifth removed to Yi Seonggye and only royal wife in Korean history who was born and came from the Jeonju Yi clan.

Biography

Early life
The future Queen Sapyeong was born into the Jeonju Yi clan as the only daughter of Yi Ui-bang, son of Yi Yong-bu and Lady Jo in Jeonju, Jeollakbuk-do.

Marriage and later life
In 1174, she married Crown Prince Wang Suk as his primary and first wife since her father had a big influence in the court. However, after 5 months reign, her father was assassinated in the coup led by Jeong-Gyun (정균), son of Jeong Jung-bu (정중부), which she later expelled from her position and out the palace according to the opinion that,
"You cannot have the rebel's daughter as a spouse and companion for you.""반역자의 딸을 동궁의 배필로 둘 수 없다."

After her husband's ascension to the throne, she then received her title back and posthumously honoured as a Queen Consort. The couple had a daughter who later married Wang Chun, Duke Hawon (왕춘 하원공).

After that, her life was not appear in both of Goryeosa or Goryeosajeolyo.

Family
Father: Yi Ui-bang (이의방, 李義方) (1121 - 12 January 1174)
Grandfather: Yi Yong-bu (이용부, 李勇夫)
Great-grandfather:Yi Gung-jin (이궁진, 李宮進)
Great-great-grandfather: Yi Jin-yu (이진유, 李珍有)
 Grandmother: Lady Yi (이씨, 李氏); daughter of Yi Hyeong (이형, 李珩) from the Samcheok Yi clan
Mother: Lady Jo (조씨, 曺氏)
Husband: Crown Prince Wang Suk (황태자 왕숙) (10 May 1152 — 26 October 1213); son of King Myeongjong and Queen Uijeong.
Daughter: Princess Suryeong (수령궁주) (1174 - ?)
Son-in-law: Wang Chun, Duke Hawon (하원공 왕춘, 河源公 王瑃); grandson of Princess Changrak and great-grandson of King Injong

In popular culture
 Portrayed by Park Eun-bin in the 2003-2004 KBS TV series Age of Warriors.

References

External links
Queen Sapyeong on Encykorea .

Royal consorts of the Goryeo Dynasty
Year of birth unknown
Year of death unknown
Jeonju Yi clan
People from Jeonju